François Brisson (born 9 April 1958) is a French former professional football player and manager. He is among the players with the most appearances in the Ligue 1, with 505 appearances to his name. As of 2021, he is a scout for Marseille.

International career 
Brisson obtained two international caps for the France national team during the 1980s. He was a member of the team that won the gold medal at the 1984 Summer Olympics in Los Angeles, scoring in the gold medal game itself.

Personal life 
François's twin brother Gilles is also a former footballer.

Honours

Player 
Marseille

 Coupe de France runner-up: 1986–87

France Olympic

 Summer Olympic Games: 1984

Manager 
Montauban

 National 3: 1995–96

References

External links
 
 
 

1958 births
Living people
People from Saintes, Charente-Maritime
French footballers
Association football forwards
France international footballers
Olympic footballers of France
Olympic gold medalists for France
Footballers at the 1984 Summer Olympics
Lille OSC players
Olympique Lyonnais players
Olympique de Marseille players
RC Strasbourg Alsace players
RC Lens players
Stade Lavallois players
Paris Saint-Germain F.C. players
Ligue 1 players
Championnat National 3 players
French football managers
RC Lens managers
Nîmes Olympique managers
Olympic medalists in football
France youth international footballers
Medalists at the 1984 Summer Olympics
Sportspeople from Charente-Maritime
Association football player-managers
Association football scouts
Olympique de Marseille non-playing staff
Montauban FCTG players
Montauban FCTG managers
Footballers from Nouvelle-Aquitaine